KF Flamurtari Ladorisht is a football club based in the village of Ladorisht near Struga, North Macedonia. They are currently competing in the Macedonian Third League (Southwest Division).

References

External links 
Flamutari Radolišta Facebook 
Club info at MacedonianFootball 
Football Federation of Macedonia 

Flamutari Radolišta
FK
Flamurtari Ladorisht